Calum Ross Macdonald (born 18 December 1997) is a professional footballer who currently plays as a left back for Bristol Rovers.

Club career
In 2016, Macdonald signed his first professional contract with Derby County. In the 2016–17 season, Macdonald was named Derby's under-23 Player of the Year. During the 2017–18 season, Macdonald spent time out on loan to National League club Barrow. On 27 August 2019, after featuring on Derby's first team bench eight times in the previous season, Macdonald signed for Blackpool on an initial two-year contract. On 3 September 2019, Macdonald made his debut for Blackpool in a 5–1 EFL Trophy win against Morecambe.

Macdonald joined Tranmere Rovers on a season-long loan on 19 August 2020. On 1 February 2021, the loan was made permanent as Macdonald signed an 18-month contract with Tranmere Rovers.

On 8 October 2022, Macdonald joined Stockport County on a short term contract until January 2023. Upon the expiration of this short-term deal, he signed a new contract to keep him at the club until the end of the season. On 31 January 2023, he joined League One club Bristol Rovers on a contract until the end of the season.

International career
Macdonald has represented Scotland at under-21 level, gaining two caps in 2016.

Career statistics

Honours
Tranmere Rovers
EFL Trophy runner-up: 2020–21

References

External links
Calum Macdonald at Soccerbase

1997 births
Living people
English footballers
Scottish footballers
Footballers from Nottingham
Scotland youth international footballers
Association football defenders
Derby County F.C. players
Barrow A.F.C. players
Blackpool F.C. players
Tranmere Rovers F.C. players
Stockport County F.C. players
Bristol Rovers F.C. players
National League (English football) players
English Football League players
English people of Scottish descent